Melanochelys is a genus of turtles in the family Geoemydidae. Members are found in India, Myanmar, Bangladesh, Sri Lanka and Nepal.

Species
Melanochelys contains only two species:
 Indian black turtle (Melanochelys trijuga)
 Tricarinate hill turtle (Melanochelys tricarinata)

References

Bibliography

 
Turtle genera
Taxa named by John Edward Gray